Selvik is a village in the municipality of Holmestrand, Vestfold og Telemark county, Norway. Its population (SSB 2005) is 1.829.

References

Villages in Vestfold og Telemark